The Bedfordshire Senior Challenge Cup, also known as the Beds Senior Cup is the county cup of Bedfordshire. According to the current rules of the competition, it is open to all clubs whose affiliation is with the Bedfordshire County FA (BCFA). The current holders  are Biggleswade Town who won the competition when it was last contested in 2019.

History

The BCFA covers the ceremonial county of Bedfordshire. The Senior Challenge Cup was first contested in 1894 and was won by Luton Montrose FC.

Winners

Beds Senior Cup

Recent Finals

Results by Team 

Clubs with one win – AFC Dunstable, Bedford Corinthians, Bedford Montrose, Bedford St Cuthberts, Eaton Bray United, Electrolux, Leagrave & District, Luton Amateur, Luton Crusaders, Luton Falcons, Luton Montrose, 61FC (Luton).

References

County Cup competitions